Gregory Hutchinson (born June 16, 1970) is an American jazz drummer.

Biography 
Hutchinson's father was a drummer in a reggae band, and he played with his father while growing up. He studied under Marvin "Smitty" Smith and Kenny Washington in the late 1980s, and began his career playing with Red Rodney in 1989–1990.

In the 1990s, he worked with Betty Carter, Roy Hargrove, Stephen Scott, Ray Brown, Eric Reed, Joe Henderson, Marcus Printup, Antonio Hart, Joshua Redman, Greg Gisbert, Frank Wess, Steve Wilson, Andy LaVerne, Johnny Griffin, LaVerne Butler, Peter Bernstein, Claire Martin, Ben Wolfe, Jeremy Davenport, Mark Whitfield, Teodross Avery, Jimmy Smith, Kristin Korb, and Rodney Whitaker.

He is also an artist at Open Studio Jazz.

References

External links 
 

20th-century American drummers
20th-century American male musicians
21st-century American drummers
21st-century American male musicians
1970 births
American jazz drummers
American male drummers
Jazz musicians from New York (state)
Living people
American male jazz musicians
Musicians from New York City